Rylan Galiardi (born June 30, 1986) is an American former professional ice hockey center. His younger brother, TJ Galiardi, is also a former professional ice hockey player in the National Hockey League.

Playing career
Undrafted, Galiardi played NCAA college hockey with the Minnesota State Mavericks men's ice hockey team in the Western Collegiate Hockey Association where he scored 29 goals and 52 assists for 81 points, and earned 82 penalty minutes in 140 games played. In his first professional season, Galiardi signed a one-year deal with the Florida Everblades of the ECHL. In 61 games, Galiardi showed offensive talents in posting 18 goals and 47 points, and was twice briefly loaned to the American Hockey League with the Providence Bruins and Bridgeport Sound Tigers.

Prior to his second professional season, Galiardi signed as a free agent to remain in the ECHL with the Gwinnett Gladiators on July 18, 2012. In the 2012–13 season, Galiardi established himself amongst the Gladiators leading scorers. On January 14, 2013, Galiardi was traded by Gwinnett, along with Christian Ouellet and Cody Carlson to the San Francisco Bulls in exchange for Justin Bowers and Sacha Guimond. His tenure with the Bulls was short lived when he was traded after 5 games to the Idaho Steelheads on February 20, 2013. In joined his third club for the season, Galiardi finished with 12 points in 15 games before he was injured in the Steelheads playoff run to the Conference finals.

On August 18, 2013, Galiardi left North American professional hockey as a free agent and signed his first contract abroad with British club, the Sheffield Steelers of the Elite Ice Hockey League. In the 2013–14 season, Galiardi scored 2 goals in 12 games before he was released due to the Steelers reaching their import limit on October 18, 2013. Galiardi returned to the ECHL with the Utah Grizzlies where he played his last professional season.

Galiardi retired to accept a Head Coach role with the Southern Tier Xpress in the junior NA3HL. For the 2015-16 season, Galiardi is the head coach of the U18 Sioux Falls Junior Stampede.

Career statistics

References

External links

1986 births
Living people
American men's ice hockey players
Bridgeport Sound Tigers players
Canadian ice hockey centres
Florida Everblades players
Gwinnett Gladiators players
Idaho Steelheads (ECHL) players
Minnesota State Mavericks men's ice hockey players
Providence Bruins players
San Antonio Rampage players
San Francisco Bulls players
Sheffield Steelers players
Utah Grizzlies (ECHL) players
Canadian expatriate ice hockey players in England

Minnesota State University, Mankato alumni